Governor Scott may refer to:

Abram M. Scott (1785–1833), 7th Governor of Mississippi
Alan James Scott (born 1934), Governor of the Cayman Islands from 1987 to 1992
Charles Scott (governor) (1739–1813), 4th Governor of Kentucky
Christina Scott (born 1974), 12th Governor of Anguilla
David Aubrey Scott (1919–2010), Governor of the Pitcairn Islands from 1973 to 1975
George Scott (British Army officer) (died 1767), Governor of Grenada from 1764 to 1767
John Scott (colonial administrator) (1878–1946), Acting Governor of Tanganyika Territory from 1924 to 1925 and Acting Governor of the Straits Settlements from 1929 to 1930
Phil Scott (born 1958), 82nd Governor of Vermont
Rick Scott (born 1952), 45th Governor of Florida
Robert Scott (colonial administrator) (1903–1968), Governor of Mauritius from 1954 to 1959
Robert Kingston Scott (1826–1900), 74th Governor of South Carolina
Robert W. Scott (1929–2009), 67th Governor of North Carolina, son of W. Kerr Scott.
W. Kerr Scott (1896–1958), 62nd Governor of North Carolina